Livadero is a village and a former community in Kozani regional unit, West Macedonia, Greece. Since the 2019 local government reform it is part of the municipality Servia, of which it is a municipal unit. The municipal unit has an area of 51.999 km2. The population in 2011 was 1,232. The postal code is 50500.

References

External links
Mokro.gr - Livadero
Livadero (in Greek) 
Cultural Council of Livadero (in Greek)
Area given by West Macedonia Development Company

Former municipalities in Western Macedonia
Populated places in Kozani (regional unit)